Leisure Suit Larry is an adult-themed sex comedy video game series created by Al Lowe. It was published by Sierra from 1987 to 2009, then by Codemasters starting in 2009. The first six Leisure Suit Larry titles, along with Magna Cum Laude and Love for Sail Mobile, were distributed by Vivendi Games (now Activision Blizzard), while Box Office Bust and Reloaded were distributed by Codemasters. Currently, the games are being published and distributed by Assemble Entertainment.

The games follow Larry Laffer, a balding, double entendre-speaking, leisure suit-wearing man in his 40s. The stories generally revolve around his attempting, usually unsuccessfully, to seduce attractive young women. , the series has sold  copies.

Games

History
The series had its origins in Sierra's earlier Softporn Adventure, a 1981 text adventure created by designer Chuck Benton; the story and basic structure from that game were reused for the first "Larry" game. The "Larry" games were one of Sierra's most popular game series during the genre's heyday, when it was first released in the mid-1980s. The series contains the only games produced by Sierra that contain significant sexual themes.

In general, the games follow the escapades of Larry Laffer as he attempts to persuade a variety of nubile women to sleep with him. A common link between the games are Larry's explorations of luxurious and cosmopolitan hotels, ships, beaches, resorts, and casinos. The character of Larry Laffer was voiced by Jan Rabson.

After the first game, the seriesdespite becoming known for its lewd contentgained a reputation for not featuring as much sexual material as expected; this was particularly true of the middle games in the series,  which were released at the same time as more explicit games, like Cobra Mission. At most, the raunchier moments were usually hidden as Easter eggs. Things became racier again toward the end of the series, particularly in the (original) final installment, Love for Sail!.

Leisure Suit Larry: Magna Cum Laude, a spin-off version of the series, featured a different protagonist and style of game play. It was developed by High Voltage Software and released by Sierra in 2004. In 2007, Vivendi Universal Games announced a mobile remake of Love for Sail! In 2008, Sierra Entertainment announced plans to release Leisure Suit Larry: Box Office Bust. It was developed by Team17, and the publishing rights were offered to Codemasters, who published the game in 2009. Larry Lovage, the protagonist of Magna Cum Laude and Box Office Bust, was voiced by Tim Dadabo. Box Office Bust was panned by critics, including Al Lowe himself, who thanked VU Games for keeping him away from developing the game.

In June 2011, Replay Games announced on their blog that they had acquired a license for the Leisure Suit Larry series. Replay Games planned to re-release the titles it licensed. It was also announced that the series' creator, Al Lowe, would be involved with the development of the new releases. In April 2012, Replay Games initiated a Kickstarter project that finished funding on May 2, 2012, and secured a total of $674,598, for which the developers promised to add more story, additional dialogue, and one more character.

The "HD" game, titled Leisure Suit Larry: Reloaded was originally announced to be released in late 2012, but it was delayed to mid-2013. In April 2013, Lowe said that early development had begun on a remake of Larry 2; Josh Mandel later confirmed the game's early development in a Kickstarter update.

Unreleased games

Leisure Suit Larry 4: The Missing Floppies
Leisure Suit Larry 4: The Missing Floppies is the name for a never-made fourth installment, often regarded as an in-joke. The name, used by official sources and fans, refers to rumors that the reason for the cancellation of the game was the losing of the game's original production floppies, after which the developers refused to remake the game from scratch. Other sources claim that it was nothing but an internal office prank. The franchise's installments were numbered as if this installment had been published; the actual fourth installment was Leisure Suit Larry 5: Passionate Patti Does a Little Undercover Work.

Al Lowe gave two official reasons for the cancellation of Leisure Suit Larry 4. The first was that Sierra had begun work on a multiplayer installment for The Sierra Network, but the project failed mostly due to technical reasons. The second was that the ending of Larry 3 was definitive and somehow metafictional, since it showed Larry and Patti coming to the Sierra studios to make games based on their adventures, as well as living happily in a mountain cabin in Coarsegold. This completed a relatively cohesive trilogy, and was a dead-end for a new story arc. In 2012, Lowe discussed what happened to the fourth installment in a video made for a Kickstarter project, in which he said that the idea for skipping Larry 4 came as a flippant comment in the office, and became a "real marketing coup" when selling Larry 5 because buyers would immediately ask what happened to the fourth. It became "one of software's big jokes".

According to production notes given by Lowe, the following events must be assumed to have happened between Larry 3 and Larry 5 to connect the two games: Larry and Patti plan to marry; Patti leaves him at a Yosemite church to pursue her career, but Larry is gone when she returns; The villain of Larry 5, Julius Biggs, somehow steals the game disks and Larry suffers amnesia. The absence of the floppy disks was introduced as a plot element in the sequel to explain how Larry, as a computer generated character, came to suffer from amnesia. Larry 4 appears in several of the other games in the series, including being played in Leisure Suit Larry: Magna Cum Laude. Leisure Suit Larry: Love For Sale Mobile takes place during the Larry 4 development years, and a subplot for the best ending requires finding the lost disks. A folder named LSL4 could be found on the CD of Leisure Suit Larry Collection in which Al Lowe left a note in a readme file referencing the game and concluding "who says sequels have to be done sequentially?".

MAD Magazine proposed what Leisure Suit Larry 4 might have looked like in a 1990 issue spoofing video games. Their idea was "the after effect of Larry's screwing around with the time coming for Larry having to pay the piper." They proposed the idea of Larry in a maze game similar to Berzerk, where he must steer clear of out-of-wedlock pregnancies he has caused, as well as private investigators, case workers and angry fathers wielding shotguns, making it extremely difficult for Larry to continue his infamous carefree attitude towards casual sex. On April 1, 2009, the abandonware site Abandonia released an alleged "leaked copy" for download. This turned out in fact to be an elaborate April Fools' Day prank: the screenshots were fakes, the review was fictional, and the "game" archive actually contained 55 identical copies of scanned front casing of Leisure Suit Larry: Box Office Bust.

The game is a part of the plot of Space Quest 4: Roger Wilco and the Time Rippers, another Sierra title. In the game, LSL4 is labeled as the cause of a supercomputer virus that crippled Roger's home planet Xenon.

Leisure Suit Larry 8
Leisure Suit Larry 8, tentatively subtitled Lust in Space (as well as Explores Uranus in some references), was in full development in 1998 until funding was cut. Shortly afterwards, Sierra's adventure games department was disbanded, and Al Lowe left Sierra on February 22, 1999. Like the canned Space Quest sequel, Larry 8 was to feature 3D computer graphics, but no more than a few test renders now survive. The game Leisure Suit Larry: Explores Uranus, as well as its teaser, was referenced in Leisure Suit Larry: Love for Sail! triggered with an Easter egg, as well as a teaser after completing the game. In 2013, Al Lowe pointed out that this title is still being considered, with support from series co-writer Josh Mandel. Lowe stated that even though he would like to complete the Reloaded series first, Leisure Suit Larry 8 is "absolutely" still in the works.

Leisure Suit Larry: Pocket Party
Leisure Suit Larry: Pocket Party was a canceled game meant to be released in the second half of 2005 for the N-Gage. The publishers were Vivendi and Nokia, while the developer was TKO-Software. In the game, players would explore a 3D college campus, while solving puzzles and engaging in risque activities. As they search for the ultimate good time, gamers bump into Rosie Palmer, the head cheerleader at Larry's college. Attempting to win over Rosie's heart, Larry is thoroughly embarrassed by her jock boyfriend Chuck Rockwell, but humiliation has never stopped Larry before and he is determined to do anything to be with Rosie. In addition to singleplayer game play, players could also wirelessly battle an opponent in four different turn-based mini-games. Concept art and design document of the game are in hands of Jody Hicks, one of the game's developers. An alpha prototype was spotted at the ObscureGamers forum in February 2021.

Leisure Suit Larry: Cocoa Butter
In late 2005, Target department stores (through online vendor Amazon.com) began accepting pre-orders for a sequel to Leisure Suit Larry: Magna Cum Laude titled Leisure Suit Larry: Cocoa Butter. This new game was being developed for the PC, PS2, Xbox and PSP systems, but has since been canceled.

Collections
Several Larry collections have been compiled:
 Larry 3-Pack (1991): This collection included the first three games that were available at the time.
 Leisure Suit Larry's Greatest Hits & Misses (1994): This CD collection included all the Larry games up to Larry 6, including both versions of the original game, the VGA floppy version of Larry 6, the Laffer Utilities and the original Softporn game. A limited edition print of the Leisure Suit Larry book was also included, titled "My Scrapbook".
 Leisure Suit Larry: Collection Series (1997): This two-CD collection included everything the previous collection contained, plus the VGA and SVGA CD-ROM versions of Larry 6, a Larry 7 preview, and Larry's Big Score: Pinball. This was the only collection to include The Official Book of LSL (Perfectbound Edition).
 Leisure Suit Larry: The Ultimate Pleasure Pack (1999): This four-CD collection was, again, otherwise identical to the one before it except that it also included the 1998 Larry's Casino and the full version of Love for Sail!
 Leisure Suit Larry Collection (2006): This barebones collection contains only the first six Larry games originally released on floppies (substituting the Larry 1 VGA remake for the EGA original, and excluding the CD edition of Larry 6). According to www.Allowe.com, Vivendi Games excluded Love for Sail! from the collection in fear that the hidden Easter egg ending would give the collection an Adults Only rating. Unlike previous collections, this one does not come with any printed documentation (instead including PDF files containing the original manuals for copy protection purposes) and the games are loaded through DOSBox.
 Leisure Suit Larry: Greatest Hits and Misses! (2013): Downloadable release on GOG.com by Codemasters. It includes Larry 1–6 (including both EGA and VGA remake of Larry 1, and the VGA and SVGA CD versions of Larry 6) and Softporn Adventure. The SVGA version of Larry 6 was slipped in during an update. Softporn Adventure was removed from the pack on February 28, 2018, but still available for those who bought it previous to that date. Larry 7 is sold separately.
 A limited-time release titled Leisure Suit Larry Collection Bundle Game Bundle ending November 24, 2021, offered by humblebundle.com includes up to nine games with two tiers: titles 1-3 for at least $1 and all nine for at least $10. The titles are: Leisure Suit Larry 1 - In the Land of the Lounge Lizards, Leisure Suit Larry 2 - Looking For Love (In Several Wrong Places), Leisure Suit Larry 3 - Passionate Patti in Pursuit of the Pulsating Pectorals, Leisure Suit Larry - Magna Cum Laude Uncut and Uncensored, Leisure Suit Larry 5 - Passionate Patti Does a Little Undercover Work, Leisure Suit Larry 6 - Shape Up Or Slip Out, Leisure Suit Larry 7 - Love for Sail, Leisure Suit Larry - Wet Dreams Don't Dry, Leisure Suit Larry - Wet Dreams Dry Twice.

Other software
 Hoyle Book of Games, Volume I (1989). Larry Laffer is a character in the game and interacts and speaks with other players.
 Crazy Nick's Software Picks: Leisure Suit Larry's Casino (1992). It is part of the Crazy Nick's Software Picks series of games, includes slot machine, blackjack, and poker taken from the In the Land of the Lounge Lizards VGA remake and Larry 5.
 The Laffer Utilities (1992), a parody of the Norton Utilities package.
 Leisure Suit Larry's Datebook (unreleased): Mentioned in a 1992 Sierra Catalogue as "Larry speaks! Custom Larry screens pop on to tell you about meetings, birthdays, work habits, and hard-drive hygiene! Let Larry organize your life. Scary, huh?" It was never released; according to Al Lowe, he did not even know it existed.
 Larry Pops Up! (1996): A non productivity utility program and screensaver released as a promo for Larry 7.
 Leisure Suit Larry's Casino (1998) in which Larry Laffer is running a casino. The game offers five casino games, three party games, a full gift shop, three restaurants, three bars and a few surprises. It also featured an online component which allowed for players to upgrade their hotel room and participate in other online-only activities, but the servers have been taken offline.
 Leisure Suit Larry: Kühle Drinks und heiße Girls (2004): a three-game mini-game pack released in Europe.
 Leisure Suit Larry's Sexy Pinball (2005), a pinball game for mobile phones.
 Leisure Suit Larry Bikini Beach Volley (2006), a beach volley game for mobile phones.
 Leisure Suit Larry Love for Sail (2007), a mobile adventure game with an original story.
 Leisure Suit Larry Magna Cum Laude (2008), a mobile game showing some mini games to play with the number pad.
 LarryCasino (2017), a gamified online casino, in which the player must help Larry to find all of the missing objects in order to move through the levels, all based around a new Larry Laffer adventure.

Other products
 The Official Book of Leisure Suit Larry (1990) (written by Al Lowe and Ralph Roberts, containing background information and hint guides). The book was revised and edited so that there was a second (1991), a third (1993), and a fourth (1997) edition, and Special Edition (released with Larry Collection).
 The Authorized Uncensored Leisure Suit Larry Bedside Companion (1990) (written by Peter Spear), containing the stories of the first three Leisure Suit Larry games, as well as detailed walkthroughs, point lists and maps. The book, like other Sierra books by Peter Spear such as The King's Quest Companion, was revised and edited so that there was a second edition (1991) covering Larry 5.

Reception
The series was ranked as the 85th top game of all time by Next Generation in 1996, for how "the designers have managed to work in enough campy humor and bad puns to keep the game going through five more installments over nine years." The total sales of the first five Leisure Suit Larry games surpassed 2 million copies by 1996, as of Love for Sails release. , the series has sold  copies.

References

External links
 LarryLaffer.net
 Al Lowe's Leisure Suit Larry page
 

 
Adventure games
Erotic video games
Leisure Suit Larry games
Obscenity controversies in video games
Sierra Entertainment games
Video game franchises introduced in 1987
Video game franchises